Mark Elliott Andrews (born September 12, 1968) is an American film director, screenwriter, animator, he is best known for the 2012 Pixar feature film Brave. He was the story supervisor for The Incredibles, directed the short film One Man Band and co-wrote the short films Jack-Jack Attack and One Man Band.

Andrews studied animation at the Character Animation Program at CalArts. After that he was one of five who got a Disney internship, but was fired after three months. He is also considered to be Brad Bird's "right-hand man". Some of his student films have been featured at MOMA's exhibition TOMORROWLAND: CalArts in Moving Pictures. Unlike most other CalArts alumni, he was not a huge fan of Disney films, and claimed he was a bigger fan of anime such as Kimba the White Lion, Speed Racer, and Robotech.

He is the father of Maeve Andrews, who voiced Jack-Jack Parr in The Incredibles. Andrews replaced Brenda Chapman as director of Brave (2012). Both were credited as directors, and they won the 2013 Academy Award for Best Animated Feature.

On January 15, 2013, it was announced that Andrews was writing and directing another feature film at Pixar. Andrews left Pixar in 2018 and his new project was eventually scrapped.

In June 2021, Netflix announced that Andrews will serve as director of the original animated series Super Giant Robot Brothers, which premiered on August 4, 2022.

Filmography

Films

Feature films

Short films

Other credits

Television

Video games

References

External links

Mark Andrews's blog
 Mark Andrews
Mark Andrews visits Calarts' Character Animation (Fall '04)
Mark Andrews at FLIP Animation Magazine Retrieved December 2012

1968 births
Living people
21st-century American screenwriters
American storyboard artists
Animators from California
Animation screenwriters
Annie Award winners
California Institute of the Arts alumni
Pixar people
American animated film directors
American male screenwriters
Primetime Emmy Award winners
Directors of Best Animated Feature Academy Award winners
21st-century American male writers